Sir Charles Lock Eastlake  (17 November 1793 – 24 December 1865) was a British painter, gallery director, collector and writer of the 19th century.  After a period as keeper, he was the first director of the National Gallery.

Life

Eastlake was born in Plymouth, Devon, the fourth son of an Admiralty lawyer. He was educated at local grammar schools in Plymouth and, briefly, at Charterhouse (then still in London). He was committed to becoming a painter, and in 1809 he became the first pupil of Benjamin Haydon and a student at the Royal Academy schools in London—where he later exhibited.

However, his first exhibited work was shown at the British Institution in 1815, a year in which he also visited Paris and studied works in the Louvre (then known as the Musée Napoléon). His first notable success was a painting Napoleon on Board the Bellerophon in Plymouth Sound (1815; National Maritime Museum, London). Like many other people at the time, Eastlake had hired a boat to take him to the ship on which Napoleon was held captive in Plymouth harbour. He sketched him from the boat.

In 1816, he travelled to Rome where he painted members of the British elite staying in Italy including fellow artists Sir Thomas Lawrence and J. M. W. Turner. He also travelled to Naples and Athens.

Despite being based predominantly in mainland Europe, Eastlake regularly sent works back to London to be exhibited, and in 1827 he was elected a member of the Royal Academy. Three years later, he returned to England permanently where he continued to paint historic and biblical paintings set in Mediterranean landscapes.

As an art historian, he translated Goethe's Zur Farbenlehre (Theory of Colours, 1840).  He edited with extensive and valuable notes the 'Handbuch der Geschichte der Malerei (Handbook of the History of Painting) by Franz Kugler, which in its first English version was translated by 'A Lady', Mrs. Margaret Hutton. These publications and Eastlake's reputation as an artist led to his nomination in 1841 to become secretary of the Fine Arts Commission, the body in charge of government art patronage. He set up home in Fitzroy Square.

In his On Vision and Colours, § 14, Schopenhauer praised Eastlake's translation of Goethe. 

Having already advised the National Gallery, London on acquisitions, he was appointed the Gallery's second Keeper in 1843, a post he later resigned "in consequence of an unfortunate purchase that roused much animadversion, a portrait erroneously ascribed to Holbein".  In 1855 he returned as the first Director, "with more extended powers".

In 1849 he married Elizabeth Rigby, an art historian and translator of German art histories, forming a formidable art history writing partnership.

In 1845, he was elected into the National Academy of Design as an Honorary Academician.  From 1850 to 1865, he was the second president of the Birmingham Society of Artists. Elected President of the Royal Academy and knighted in 1850, he became a notable figure in the British art establishment, being appointed the first President of the Photographic Society in 1853 and, in 1855, the first Director of the National Gallery. His directorship was marred by the signal failure of the National Gallery to fulfill the terms of the bequest of J.M.W.Turner, his erstwhile friend. Cambridge University awarded him an honorary degree in 1864.

Legacy
Eastlake died in Pisa, Italy, on Christmas Eve 1865, and is buried at Kensal Green Cemetery, London.  His will provided for the Gallery to purchase his own collection of paintings. Lady Eastlake sold her husband's art history book collection to the Gallery's library.

Gallery

Publications
Materials for a History of Oil Painting (1847). A second volume was published posthumously in 1869.
Contributions to the Literature of the Fine Arts (1848).

See also
 On Vision and Colors

References

Attribution
; Endnotes:
Memoir by Lady Eastlake prefixed to the second series of Contributions to the Literature of the Fine Arts
Pictures by Sir Charles Eastlake
Haydon's Autobiography
Catalogue of the National Gallery (Wornum), and books mentioned in the text.

External links

 
 
 
 

 , an engraving of the painting in Friendship's Offering, 1827, with the poem The Brigand Leader and his Wife by Felicia Hemans.

1793 births
1865 deaths
Artists from Plymouth, Devon
People educated at Charterhouse School
English curators
19th-century English painters
English male painters
English art historians
Directors of the National Gallery, London
English translators
Royal Academicians
Knights Bachelor
Fellows of the Royal Society
Burials at Kensal Green Cemetery
Members and Associates of the Royal Birmingham Society of Artists
19th-century British translators
19th-century male artists
Translators of Johann Wolfgang von Goethe
19th-century British businesspeople
Writers from Plymouth, Devon
Committee members of the Society for the Diffusion of Useful Knowledge